A Duet, with an Occasional Chorus is a novel by British author Sir Arthur Conan Doyle, published in 1899 by Grant Richards in the UK and D. Appleton in the US. The novel features the story of a happily married couple which is threatened by a previous lover of the husband. Conan Doyle hoped that this would be his most successful novel to date, but the novel was widely panned for being banal and inane.

References

1899 British novels
Novels by Arthur Conan Doyle